The Islamic Revolution Document Center (IRDC) is a research institution, founded in 1981, that collects and maintains documents related to the Iranian Revolution and other Islamic history.

References

External links 
 Islamic Revolution Documents Center's website

1981 establishments in Iran
Iranian Revolution
Libraries established in 1981
Research institutes in Iran